Players and pairs who neither have high enough rankings nor receive wild cards may participate in a qualifying tournament held one week before the annual Wimbledon Tennis Championships.

Seeds

  Jeff Morrison (qualifying competition, lucky loser)
  Jürgen Melzer (qualified)
  Takao Suzuki (first round)
  Lee Hyung-taik (qualified)
  Robby Ginepri (second round)
  Ota Fukárek (first round)
  Axel Pretzsch (second round)
  Yuri Schukin (first round)
  Jack Brasington (qualified)
  Ricardo Mello (second round)
  Brian Vahaly (qualifying competition, lucky loser)
  George Bastl (qualifying competition, lucky loser)
  Dick Norman (first round)
  Mardy Fish (first round)
  Radek Štěpánek (qualified)
  Denis Golovanov (qualifying competition, lucky loser)
  Justin Gimelstob (qualifying competition)
  Mario Ančić (qualified)
  Sébastien de Chaunac (first round)
  Alexander Waske (qualified)
  Gabriel Trifu (first round)
  Daniel Melo (first round)
  Cyril Saulnier (qualified)
  Noam Behr (first round)
  Vladimir Voltchkov (first round)
  Wayne Black (second round)
  Jean-François Bachelot (qualified)
  Didac Pérez (second round)
  Gilles Elseneer (qualifying competition)
  Jeff Salzenstein (first round)
  Grégory Carraz (qualified)
  Federico Luzzi (second round)

Qualifiers

  Cyril Saulnier
  Jürgen Melzer
  Cristiano Caratti
  Lee Hyung-taik
  Nicolas Thomann
  Karol Beck
  Juan Pablo Guzmán
  Scott Draper
  Jack Brasington
  Konstantinos Economidis
  Jean-François Bachelot
  Alexander Waske
  Mario Ančić
  Justin Bower
  Radek Štěpánek
  Grégory Carraz

Lucky losers

  Jeff Morrison
  Brian Vahaly
  George Bastl
  Denis Golovanov

Qualifying draw

First qualifier

Second qualifier

Third qualifier

Fourth qualifier

Fifth qualifier

Sixth qualifier

Seventh qualifier

Eighth qualifier

Ninth qualifier

Tenth qualifier

Eleventh qualifier

Twelfth qualifier

Thirteenth qualifier

Fourteenth qualifier

Fifteenth qualifier

Sixteenth qualifier

External links

 2002 Wimbledon Championships – Men's draws and results at the International Tennis Federation

Men's Singles Qualifying
Wimbledon Championship by year – Men's singles qualifying